Anhui Hefei Guiguan Football Club was a Chinese football club based in Hefei, Anhui.

On 11 July 2018, the Chinese Football Association announced Anhui Hefei Guiguan failed to register for the rest of the season due to wage arrears.

Managerial history
  Huang Yan (2016)

  Kim do keun (2016-2017)

  Darko Nović (2017)
  Aleksandar Pantić (2018)

Results
All-time league rankings

As of the end of 2018 season.

Key
 Pld = Played
 W = Games won
 D = Games drawn
 L = Games lost
 F = Goals for
 A = Goals against
 Pts = Points
 Pos = Final position

 DNQ = Did not qualify
 DNE = Did not enter
 NH = Not Held
 – = Does Not Exist
 R1 = Round 1
 R2 = Round 2
 R3 = Round 3
 R4 = Round 4

 F = Final
 SF = Semi-finals
 QF = Quarter-finals
 R16 = Round of 16
 Group = Group stage
 GS2 = Second Group stage
 QR1 = First Qualifying Round
 QR2 = Second Qualifying Round
 QR3 = Third Qualifying Round

References

Football clubs in China
Defunct football clubs in China